The R410 is a Regional Route in South Africa. Its western terminus is the R392 near Queenstown. It heads east-north-east to Lady Frere. Thereafter, it meets the southern terminus of the R396. Continuing east-north-east it passes through Cala and the Cala Pass to end at a junction with the R58 just south-west of Elliot.

References

Regional Routes in the Eastern Cape